Lux is the debut studio album from American Alternative metal band Gemini Syndrome. It was released on September 10, 2013 through Warner Bros. Records. "Pleasure and Pain", "Basement", "Left of Me," and "Stardust" have all been released as singles. The final single "Stardust" peaked at No. 19 on the Mainstream Rock Tracks chart in the US. "Basement," "Resurrection," "Take This," and "Syndrome" were all previously released on the rare EP they released in January 2011.

Reception 
The album peaked at No. 3 on Top Heatseekers charts.

Song Meanings 

Aaron Nordstrom on Basement:
"Basement is pretty personal. That's just blatant discussion of me being the teenager with Albinism and my conversation with God at the time and being angry about it, not trying - not really understanding where I fit in in society in my peer group. [...] It was a working title at beginning, but it kinda worked out in a sense that as a kid, and even if I could now, I would, I always lived in the basement because it was darker. I'm photosensitive, being Albino, so it was always darker."

Aaron Nordstrom on Mourning Star:
"I wrote that at really stressful time of my life. It's not directly related to anything I was going through necessarily at the time. That song is more of a diatribe about the fall of Lucifer from heaven and in that sense of metaphor for everybody's kinda battle with their own faith in, I don't want to say God necessarily, but you know, their place in the universe and your purpose for being here. I went through a very, very emotional point when I was writing that song. That was a really heavy emotional time for me to put on paper."

Track listing

Personnel

Musicians 
 Aaron Nordstrom - lead vocals
 Rich Juzwick - guitars, backing vocals
 Mike Salerno - guitars, backing vocals
 Alessandro Paveri - bass
 Brian Steele Medina - drums

References 

2013 debut albums
Gemini Syndrome albums
Warner Records albums
Albums produced by Kevin Churko